The men's 4 × 400 metres relay at the 2017 World Championships in Athletics was held at the London Olympic Stadium on 12 August.

Summary

The final race of the World Championships started fairly even, with USA's Wilbert London III and Britain's Matthew Hudson-Smith gaining slightly on the stagger on the inside, while Spain's Óscar Husillos was gaining on Trinidad and Tobago's Jarrin Solomon further toward the outside.  Belgium's Robin Vanderbemden also looked to be having a strong leg all alone in lane 9.  Coming down the homestretch, London sped up to have the USA the handoff first to Gil Roberts.  Roberts came around the turn to take a 3-metre lead at the break, followed by GBR's Rabah Yousif and Spain's Lucas Búa, TTO's Jereem Richards was on the outside passing people.  Into the far turn, he had beaten Yousif and kept going making up the gap on Roberts getting to within a metre.  Down the homestretch, Roberts again opened up the gap, handing off to Michael Cherry three metres ahead of Trinidad and Tobago's handoff to Machel Cedenio.  Great Britain's handoff to Dwayne Cowan was just a metre back as the top three teams had separated from the rest of the contenders.  Through most of the lap, Cherry held a five-metre lead while Cowan was challenging Cedenio.  Cedenio held off Cowan then on the homestretch he separated, making a run at Cherry.  USA passed to Fred Kerley barely a metre ahead of TTO's pass to Lalonde Gordon.  Kerley was the anchor runner of the fastest 4x400 relay of the year prior to the championships, running for Texas A&M at the end of the college season more than two months earlier.  Kerley held that one-metre lead down the backstretch, then widened it slightly through the final turn.  Behind Gordon, GBR's Martyn Rooney was closing down the gap to bring his team to within a metre coming off the turn.  Kerley straightened up and ran tight for the finish while Gordon went to the outside for running room and ran past him, pulling away to a decisive 3-metre victory.  Kerley maintained his distance from Rooney to get silver for USA.  GBR's Rooney finished 8 metres ahead of the Belgian team, which included three Borlée brothers.

Records
Before the competition records were as follows:

The following records were set at the competition:

Qualification criteria
The first eight placed teams at the 2017 IAAF World Relays and the host country qualify automatically for entry with remaining places being filled by teams with the fastest performances during the qualification period.

Schedule
The event schedule, in local time (UTC+1), is as follows:

Results

Heats

The first round took place on 12 August in two heats as follows:

The first three in each heat ( Q ) and the next two fastest ( q ) qualified for the final. The overall results were as follows:

Final
The final took place on 13 August at 22:20. The results were as follows (photo finish):

References

relay
Relays at the World Athletics Championships